Expert Review of Dermatology was a bimonthly peer-reviewed medical journal covering all aspects of dermatology. It was established in 2001 and ceased publication in 2013. It was published by Informa and abstracted and indexed in Scopus.

References

English-language journals
Expert Review journals
Dermatology journals
Bimonthly journals
Publications established in 2001
Publications disestablished in 2013
Defunct journals